Foxtel Box Office is one of Foxtel's Pay Per View systems, which shows movies. It has 14 channels. Films currently come to Foxtel Box Office same day as DVD or 1–3 months after DVD release

External links
Official website

Television channels and stations established in 2004
2004 establishments in Australia
English-language television stations in Australia
Movie channels in Australia